Golden Glades is a census-designated place (CDP) in Miami-Dade County, Florida, United States. The population was 32,499 at the 2020 census.

It is the location for a Golden Glades Interchange which connects the Florida Turnpike, Interstate 95, US 441, State Road 9, and the Palmetto Expressway.

Geography 
Golden Glades is located in northeastern Miami-Dade County at  (25.912771, -80.197688). The community is bordered by four cities: Miami Gardens to the northwest, North Miami Beach to the northeast, North Miami to the southeast and south, and Opa-locka to the west.

The Golden Glades Interchange is on the northern side of the community. From it, Interstate 95 leads south  to the center of Miami and north-northeast  to Fort Lauderdale, Florida's Turnpike leads north parallel to and inland from I-95, and the Palmetto Expressway leads west and south  to U.S. Route 1 in Pinecrest. From the same interchange, State Road 9, a surface road, leads southwest  to the center of Opa-locka, and U.S. 441 leads south parallel to I-95 as far as downtown Miami.

Demographics

2020 census

Note: the US Census treats Hispanic/Latino as an ethnic category. This table excludes Latinos from the racial categories and assigns them to a separate category. Hispanics/Latinos can be of any race.

2010 Census
As of the census of 2010, there were 33,145 people, 9,826 households, and 7,281 families residing in the CDP.  The population density was 2,560.1/km2 (6,635.0/mi2).  There were 10,540 housing units at an average density of 827.1/km2 (2,143.7/mi2).  The racial makeup of the CDP was 23.38% White, with 7.0% Non-Hispanic White; 72.8% African American, 0.28% Native American, 1.6% Asian, 0.07% Pacific Islander, 2.1% from other races, and 3.1% from two or more races. Hispanic or Latino of any race were 18.5% of the population.

There were 9,826 households, out of which 44.5% had children under the age of 18 living with them, 41.8% were married couples living together, 24.5% had a female householder with no husband present, and 25.9% were non-families. 20.6% of all households were made up of individuals, and 7.3% had someone living alone who was 65 years of age or older.  The average household size was 3.23 and the average family size was 3.72.

In the CDP, the population distribution showed 31.1% under the age of 18, 10.2% from 18 to 24, 30.1% from 25 to 44, 18.5% from 45 to 64, and 10.1% who were 65 years of age or older.  The median age was 31 years.  For every 100 females, there were 89.2 males.  For every 100 females age 18 and over, there were 83.8 males.

The median income for a household in the CDP was $30,841, and the median income for a family was $33,577. Males had a median income of $25,036 versus $21,409 for females. The per capita income for the CDP was $12,341.  About 18.5% of families and 20.9% of the population were below the poverty line, including 25.4% of those under age 18 and 24.0% of those age 65 or over.

As of 2000, speakers of English as a first language accounted for 44.27% of residents, while Haitian Creole made up 31.35%, Spanish was at 18.63%, and French was at 3.82% of the population.

Education
Golden Glades is within the Miami-Dade County Public Schools.

Transportation
Golden Glades is served by Tri-Rail at the Golden Glades station. It contains a park-and-ride facility, and also serves as a feeder for buses from the surrounding area, run by both Miami-Dade Transit and Broward County Transit.

References 

Haitian-American culture in Florida
Census-designated places in Miami-Dade County, Florida
Census-designated places in Florida